Bara may refer to:
 Ghera language, an Indo-Aryan language of Pakistan
 Bara Malagasy, a variety of the Malagasy language of Madagascar
 Kachari language, a Sino-Tibetan language of Assam, India.

Bará may refer to:
 Waimajã language, a Tucanoan language of Colombia and Brazil
 Barasana-Eduria language, a related Tucanoan language of Colombia